Elaeagnus umbellata is known as Japanese silverberry, umbellata oleaster, autumn olive, autumn elaeagnus, or spreading oleaster. The species is indigenous to eastern Asia and ranges from the Himalayas eastwards to Japan. It is a hardy, aggressive invasive species able to readily colonize barren land, becoming a troublesome plant in the central and northeastern United States and Europe.

Description
It commonly bears sharp thorns in the form of spur branches. Flowers are fragrant and occur in clusters of white to yellow, 8–9 mm in length and 7 mm in diameter, and have four lobes.

The leaves are alternate, 4–10 cm long and 2–4 cm wide with wavy margins. The leaves are covered with minute silvery scales when they emerge early in spring, but turn greener above as the scales wear off during the summer. The underside is more intensely covered in the silvery scales, differing from the related E. angustifolia, which remains silvery until it sheds its leaves in the fall.

Flowers
The flowers are borne in the leaf axils in clusters of 1-7. They are pale yellowish-white, fragrant, (often heavily fragrant) and have a four-lobed corolla 1 cm long. They are an important source of nectar for pollinators such as bees.

Fruit

The fruit is a small round drupe 1/4 to 1/3 inches (0.65 to 0.85 cm) in diameter. The unripe fruit is silvery-scaled and yellow. It ripens to red, dotted with silver or brown. The ripe fruits are pulpy, juicy and sweet, 3–9 mm in length, 5 mm in diameter, and average 137 milligrams in weight, with a thin skin covering the whole fruit. Having a sweet and tart flavor, the berries can be eaten fresh or processed for jam, condiments, flavoring, or used as a substitute for tomato. When mature, the red berries contain carotenoids, including considerable amounts of lycopene.

Naturalization
In its origin regions of tropical and temperate Asia, E. umbellata is not considered to be an invasive species, but in many world regions, it has become invasive across wild and cultivated areas, particularly in the eastern United States. In the early 19th century, E. umbellata was purposely introduced to the United States and the United Kingdom for shelter belts, erosion control, wasteland reclamation, wildlife habitat, and for gardens as an ornamental. By the late 20th century, the shrub became a noxious weed and invasive species in many US states from the east coast to the central prairies, and spread widely across Europe.

Due to its substantial seed production and avid germination potential, E. umbellata rapidly invades new areas where it can resprout readily after burning or cutting. Because E. umbellata stands are habitats for wildlife, such as providing forage and shelter for deer, nesting sites for birds, and berries as food for several species, it has been planted for wildlife management in parts of the United States.

In Europe, E. umbellata has spread to the United Kingdom, Belgium, France, and Italy, but has been cultivated in the Netherlands and Scotland. In some parts of North America where it has become naturalized, E. umbellata is considered a noxious weed, particularly in the central and northeastern United States. In Canada, it is a "prohibited noxious weed" under the Alberta Weed Control Act 2010.

Because it fixes atmospheric nitrogen in its roots, E. umbellata may grow vigorously and sometimes competitively in infertile soils. It can increase available nitrogen in soils and benefit some nearby plants, and when grown in orchards, it can increase yields of adjacent fruit trees up to 10%. However, its ability to change soil chemistry can severely alter or destroy native plant communities.

Gallery

References

External links

Elaeagnus umbellata images; Bioimages from Vanderbilt University, Nashville, TN, USA
 Species Profile - Autumn Olive (Elaeagnus umbellata), National Invasive Species Information Center, United States National Agricultural Library.

umbellata